is a junction passenger railway station located in the city of Tsuyama, Okayama Prefecture, Japan, operated by West Japan Railway Company (JR West).

Lines
It is also a station on the Kishin Line and is 83.7 kilometers from the terminus of that line at

Station layout
The station consists of one ground-level side platform and one ground level island platform serving three tracks. The Kishin Line bound for Sayo and the Inbi Line bound for Chizu stop at Platform 1 adjacent to the station building. Platforms 2 and 3 on the island style are connected by a level crossing, and trains bound for Tsuyama stop at Platform 2. Platform 3 is siding for track maintenance vehicles that are connected only in the Tsuyama direction, and passenger trains do not enter the track. The station is unattended.

Platforms

History
Higashi-Tsuyama Station opened on March 15, 1928. With the privatization of the Japan National Railways (JNR) on April 1, 1987, the station came under the aegis of the West Japan Railway Company.

Passenger statistics
In fiscal 2019, the station was used by an average of 116 passengers daily..

Surrounding area
 Yoshii River
 Japan National Route 53
 Tsuyama Central Hospital

See also
List of railway stations in Japan

References

External links

  Higashi-Tsuyama Station Official Site

Railway stations in Okayama Prefecture
Railway stations in Japan opened in 1928
Tsuyama